Alibi in Ashes is the 25th installment in the Nancy Drew point-and-click adventure game series by Her Interactive. The game is available for play on Microsoft Windows and Mac OS X platforms. It has an ESRB rating of E for moments of mild violence and peril. Players take on the first-person view of fictional amateur sleuth Nancy Drew and must solve the mystery through interrogation of suspects, solving puzzles, and discovering clues. There are two levels of gameplay, Junior and Senior detective modes, each offering a different difficulty level of puzzles and hints, however neither of these changes affects the actual plot of the game. The game is loosely based on two books: False Impressions (1990) and The Clues Challenge (2000).

Plot
Nancy Drew returns to her hometown of River Heights to compete in the town's annual Clues Challenge along with her boyfriend Ned and her friends Bess and George. However, when River Heights' old town hall burns to the ground, Nancy finds herself in jail as the prime suspect in the arson case. Nancy must work with her friends to clear her name and catch the culprit.

Development

Playable Characters

 Nancy Drew (Lani Minella) - Nancy is an 18-year-old amateur detective from the fictional town of River Heights in the United States. Nancy has been arrested on suspicion of arson. She has access to all of the police station's equipment in order to help prove her innocence.
 Ned Nickerson (Scott Carty) - Ned is Nancy's longtime and loyal boyfriend. He arranged for the team to participate in the River Heights Clues Challenge. When Nancy is arrested, he is ready to help her clear her name in any way he can, even if it means using his charm and handsome features to learn more information and distract suspects. 
 Bess Marvin (Jennifer Pratt) - Bess is one of Nancy's best friends. She is a sweet, positive, but sometimes high-strung girl who is worried about Nancy. She is willing to set aside her anxiety in order to help get Nancy out of jail and prove her innocence. Her skill in gossiping could lure the right information out of a suspect, so long as her brain doesn't freeze from eating too much ice cream. 
 George Fayne (Chiara Motley) - George, Nancy's other best friend, tends to be more sensible and down to earth than her cousin, Bess. Though her less optimistic outlook can make conversing with suspects difficult, when given the opportunity, George knows just what questions to ask. Her energy and love for high tech gadgetry will come in handy to Nancy and the case.

Characters

 Toni Scallari (Laura Hanson) - Toni stays busy as an elected official on the River Heights City Council, but keeps in touch with her voters by running the local ice cream parlor, Scoop. Toni holds great sway in the community, and appears to be approachable and pleasant. Is this practiced politician's friendly facade covering up darker secrets?
 Alexei Markovic (Gene Thorkildsen) - Alexei is River Heights' eccentric quasi-recluse who owns the antique shop. He used to be an amateur detective until a case went awry that ruined his reputation. With his knowledge of the town and its history, how far would Alexei go to try to clear his name? 
 Deirdre Shannon (Meaghan Halverson) - Deirdre is an old classmate of Nancy's. She is a spoiled rich girl whose family is constantly being bested by the Drews', and the Clues Challenge is proving to be no different. Competitive, haughty, and arrogant, she's tired of placing second. How far will she go to top Nancy in this competition?
 Brenda Carlton (Megan Jones) - Brenda considers herself an ace crime reporter for the Heights Nine News Team. Her impulsive style tends to put sensationalism over accuracy, regardless of the cost to others. Could she have a deeper story hiding behind her microphone?
 Chief McGinnis (Mark Dodson) - Chief McGinnis is the head of the local police department and has worked with Nancy on cases many times before. He doesn't quite believe Nancy is guilty, but he is pressured to take her into custody with the evidence surrounding her. McGinnis is willing to let Nancy work on proving her innocence while being held at the police station.

Additional voice work was performed by Jennifer Pratt, Alex Yopp, James Crowder, Robert Riedl, and Ian Schwartz.

Reception 

Jinny Gudmundsen of USA Today rated it 2.5/4 stars and wrote, "Alibi in Ashes is a good mystery game, particularly for younger players new to the Nancy Drew franchise; but seasoned players of the series might be disappointed...While it is fun to explore Nancy's hometown of River Heights and her childhood house, the game limits your investigation areas to only a few actual locations. And the switching-between-friends mechanic grows old quickly. It is a good mystery but not a great one."  Erin Bell of Gamezebo rated it 3/5 stars and wrote, "Alibi in Ashes should be praised for trying out some new gameplay ideas to shake up the formula, but in the end it’s not as strong as some of the other games in the Nancy Drew series."  Merlina McGovern of Adventure Gamers rated it 3.5/5 stars and wrote, "You won’t see Nancy’s home town through state-of-the art graphics, but Alibi in Ashes provides an entertaining window into the teen sleuth’s personal life."

References

   
 

2011 video games
Detective video games
Video games based on Nancy Drew
Point-and-click adventure games
Video games scored by Kevin Manthei
Video games developed in the United States
Video games set in the United States
Windows games
MacOS games
Her Interactive games
Single-player video games
North America-exclusive video games